Ajatshatru Singh (born 17 September 1992) is an Indian cricketer. He played the different formats of First-class cricket, List A cricket and T20 for the Jharkhand cricket team between 2012 and 2013.

References

External links
 

1992 births
Living people
Indian cricketers